Bilborough is a suburb of the city of Nottingham, England. The population of the City of Nottingham ward at the 2011 census was 16,792.

St Martin of Tours' Church, Bilborough is a Grade II listed building. In the chancel is an Annunciation by Evelyn Gibbs, painted in 1946 and rediscovered in 2009 and restored. Located just off the A6002 road is Bilborough College.

Education

Bilborough is home to the following schools and colleges:

Nottingham University Samworth Academy (NUSA), and also is home to Portland, Melbury, Highwood which are all feeders to (NUSA)
Bilborough College
Oak Field School 
Bluecoat Beechdale Academy
Westbury School primary and secondary
Bluecoat Primary Academy

Sports
Harvey Hadden Stadium is a well known local sport facility with outdoor running track and athletics facilities. The stadium originally had a velodrome.

Bus services
Nottingham City Transport
 28: Nottingham → Ilkeston Road → Jubilee Campus → Beechdale → Bilborough

 35: Nottingham → Derby Road → QMC → University Park → Wollaton Vale → Bilborough → Strelley → Bulwell

 35B: Nottingham → Derby Road → QMC → University Park → Wollaton Vale → Bilborough → Strelley

 N28: Nottingham → Jubilee Campus → Beechdale → Bilborough → Wollaton Vale → Wollaton → Ilkeston Road → Nottingham

Nottingham Community Transport
 L3: Nottingham → Derby Road → QMC → Beechdale → Bilborough → Strelley

 L11: Beeston → Wollaton Vale → Bilborough → Aspley Lane → Basford → Bulwell → Top Valley → Bestwood Park → Arnold

Bilborough College
 Collegelink: Nottingham → Bilborough (Bilborough College)

References

Areas of Nottingham